Scott Stewart Bakula (born October 9, 1954) is an American actor. He is known for his roles in two science-fiction television series: as Sam Beckett on Quantum Leap and as Captain Jonathan Archer on Star Trek: Enterprise. For Quantum Leap, he received four Emmy Award nominations and a Golden Globe Award.

Bakula starred in the comedy-drama series Men of a Certain Age and guest-starred in the second and third seasons of NBC's Chuck as the title character's father Stephen J. Bartowski. From 2014 to 2015, he played entrepreneur Lynn on the HBO show Looking. From 2014 to 2021, he portrayed Special Agent Dwayne Cassius "King" Pride on NCIS: New Orleans.

Early life
Bakula was born in St. Louis, Missouri, the son of Sally and Joseph Stewart Bakula (1928–2014), a lawyer. He has a younger brother and a younger sister. The family surname comes from Czech and Bohemian ancestry, translating literally to "stick" (spelled bakuľa). He attended Jefferson College, followed by the University of Kansas for a time, but left, saying:

Career
Bakula moved to New York City in 1976, made his Broadway debut playing baseball legend Joe DiMaggio in 1983's Marilyn: An American Fable, and appeared in the well-received 1985 Off-Broadway production Three Guys Naked from the Waist Down; he would later appear in its Pasadena Playhouse production. The success of Three Guys Off-Broadway brought him attention, and when his next show, the musical Nightclub Confidential, which co-starred his wife Krista Neumann, moved to Los Angeles, he moved there at the urging of his California agent, Maggie Henderson, and his New York agent, Jerry Hogan. As Bakula recalled in 2000:

He was cast in two short-lived series: Gung Ho and Eisenhower & Lutz. During a Hollywood writers' strike, he returned to New York to star in Romance/Romance, and then afterward landed the lead role opposite co-star Dean Stockwell in the science fiction television series Quantum Leap (1989–1993). Bakula played time traveler Dr. Sam Beckett, who was trapped by a malfunction of his time machine to correct things gone wrong in the past. His performance in the show earned him a Golden Globe Award (along with three nominations) and four Emmy Award nominations for Best Actor, as well as five consecutive Viewers for Quality Television Awards for Best Actor in a Quality Drama Series.

From 1993 to 1995, he played Peter Hunt, a reporter and occasional love interest on the sitcom Murphy Brown. In 1995, Bakula appeared on the cover of Playgirl. He played the titular Mr. Smith in the sole season of Mr. & Mrs. Smith in 1996. He voiced Danny Cat in the animated film Cats Don't Dance (1997). He played the aging veteran pitcher Gus Cantrell in Major League: Back to the Minors (1998), the final movie in the Major League trilogy. He also played Jim Olmeyer, the same-sex partner of Sam Robards' Jim Berkley, in the film American Beauty (1999).

Bakula played Jonathan Archer, captain of Earth's first Warp 5 interstellar starship, on Star Trek: Enterprise  from 2001 to 2005. In 2006, he reprised the role of Archer for the Star Trek: Legacy PC and Xbox 360 video games as a voice-over.

Bakula starred in the musical Shenandoah, a play which also provided his first professional theatrical role in 1976, at Ford's Theatre, in 2006. Bakula is heard singing "Pig Island" on Sandra Boynton's children's CD Philadelphia Chickens, which is labeled as being "For all ages except 43." Scott Bakula said that he might be starring as Sam in a Quantum Leap film as stated in TV Guide Magazine along with Dean Stockwell. At Comic Con 2010, he announced that a script was being worked on and that while he would be in the movie, he would not have the main role.

Bakula performed various songs from his career for a one-night-only performance entitled An Evening with Scott Bakula at Sidney Harman Hall on January 18, 2008, as a benefit for the restoration of the historic Ford's Theater. Bakula had three appearances in 2008. He appeared as Atty. Jack Ross in an episode of Boston Legal, "Glow in the Dark", which aired on February 12, 2008, on the ABC network. From March 4 – April 20, he starred as Tony Hunter in the world premiere of Dancing in the Dark at The Old Globe in San Diego, California. Dancing in the Dark is based on the movie The Band Wagon (1953). Bakula appeared as the character Chris Fulbright in the five-episode run of the Tracey Ullman sketch comedy series State of the Union on Showtime.

Bakula appeared in the dark comedy film The Informant! (2009) as Brian Shepard, an FBI agent. In April 2009, he began a recurring role on the television series Chuck as Stephen J. Bartowski, the eponymous character's long-lost father. From July 31 to August 2, 2009, he starred as Nathan Detroit in three performances of Guys and Dolls at the Hollywood Bowl. Beginning in December 2009, Bakula began appearing as Terry, one of the three lead characters in TNT's hour-long comedy/drama Men of a Certain Age.

In 2011, Bakula performed a voice cameo in the film Source Code as a slight nod to his character on Quantum Leap, with his catchphrase of "Oh, boy." and appeared in the feature-length documentary The Captains, which was written and directed by William Shatner, Bakula is interviewed by the original Star Trek captain about his life and career leading up to his performances as Captain Jonathan Archer in Star Trek: Enterprise. In the movie, Shatner interviews Bakula at his ranch in California where they discuss the pitfalls that come with a career in television.

In September 2011, Bakula starred in Terrible Advice by Saul Rubinek at the Menier Chocolate Factory. In April to May 2012, he guest starred in the last five episodes of Desperate Housewives as Bree Van de Kamp's criminal defense lawyer and third husband. In April 2013, he made a guest appearance on Two and a Half Men as a car dealer. In August 2013, it was announced Bakula would have a recurring role in the first season of HBO's new series Looking. He also appeared in the film Geography Club (2013).

In February 2014, Bakula was cast as the lead in a backdoor pilot for the NCIS spin-off series, NCIS: New Orleans, which began as a two-part episode of its parent series in the spring season of 2014.

In 2016 Bakula appeared as a guest judge on the HGTV show Brothers Take New Orleans with Property Brothers hosts Jonathan and Drew Scott.

He made a cameo appearance as himself in the season 12 opening episode of It's Always Sunny in Philadelphia.

Personal life
Bakula married Krista Neumann in 1981. They had two children before divorcing in 1995. He married actress Chelsea Field in 2009 after a 15-year relationship. Bakula and Field share two children.

Bakula says he was "hardly ever home for four and a half seasons" of Quantum Leap, so he chose to prioritize his family life on later projects. His Star Trek: Enterprise contract required that filming be completed by 6p.m. every Wednesday so he could have dinner with his family. During filming of NCIS: New Orleans, he returned home to Los Angeles every weekend to spend time with his wife.

Filmography

Film

Television

Theatre

Awards and nominations

References

External links

 
 
 
 
 Scott Bakula 2000 Interview on Sidewalks Entertainment
 

1954 births
20th-century American male actors
21st-century American male actors
American male film actors
American male musical theatre actors
American male stage actors
American male television actors
American male voice actors
American people of Czech descent
Best Drama Actor Golden Globe (television) winners
Jefferson College (Missouri) alumni
Living people
Male actors from St. Louis
University of Kansas alumni